Eridachtha kasyella is a moth in the family Lecithoceridae. It was described by László Anthony Gozmány in 1978. It is found in Afghanistan.

References

Moths described in 1978
Eridachtha